Rick Ellis is a New Zealand businessman who was the chief executive of Wellington's Museum of New Zealand Te Papa Tongarewa from 2014 to 2017. Prior to this position, he was group managing director of Telstra subsidiary Telstra Digital Media. Before joining Telstra, Ellis was CEO of TVNZ.

References

Place of birth missing (living people)
Year of birth missing (living people)
Living people
New Zealand chief executives
Telstra people
TVNZ